Borgåbladet was a Swedish language newspaper that was published five times a week from the town of Porvoo in Finland. It was the third oldest newspaper in Finland.

History and profile
Borgåbladet was founded in 1860. The paper was published in Swedish language and was owned by a foundation, Konstsamfundet. Its publisher was the KSF Media which also publishes Västra Nyland, Östra Nyland, Hangötidningen, Hufvudstadsbladet and Loviisan Sanomat.

Borgåbladet was published five times per week and its headquarters were in Porvoo.

The circulation of Borgåbladet was 9,020 copies in 1996. The paper had a circulation of 7,798 copies in 2010 and 7,523 copies in 2011.

In January 2015, Borgåbladet and Östra Nyland were amalgamated into the new newspaper Östnyland.

References

External links
Borgåbladet 

1860 establishments in Finland
Newspapers established in 1860
Daily newspapers published in Finland
Swedish-language newspapers published in Finland
Mass media in Porvoo
Publications disestablished in 2015
2015 disestablishments in Finland